The 1965 Arkansas Razorbacks football team represented the University of Arkansas in the Southwest Conference (SWC) during the 1965 NCAA University Division football season. In their eighth year under head coach Frank Broyles, the Razorbacks compiled a 10–1 record (7–0 against SWC opponents), won the SWC championship, and outscored all opponents by a combined total of 331 to 118.  The Razorbacks were undefeated in the regular season and ranked #3 in the final AP Poll and #2 in the final UPI Coaches Poll.  They went on to lose to LSU in the 1966 Cotton Bowl Classic by a 14–7 score, due in large part to Arkansas QB Jon Brittenum going down with an injury in the first half.

Running back Bobby Burnett tied three others in scoring, with 16 touchdowns, the fourth-highest total in the nation. Ronny South was second in kick scoring, with 42 extra points and six field goals. As an offensive unit, the Razorbacks had the best scoring offense (32.4 ppg), the eighth-best rushing offense (226.1 ypg), seventh-best total offense (360.2 ypg) nationally. The defense was fourth-best against the run (74.9 yards allowed per game).

Schedule

Game summaries

Texas

Source:

Cotton Bowl

The Arkansas Razorbacks put their 22-game win streak on the line in the 1966 Cotton Bowl Classic against their rivals, the Tigers of LSU. Arkansas had the number-one scoring offense coming into the game, averaging 32.4 points per contest.

Arkansas took the ball to the end zone on the opening drive, capped by a 19-yard toss from Jon Brittenum to All-American end Bobby Crockett. Running back Joe LaBruzzo then ran in from three yards out for the Bengal Tigers to tie the game at 7. Razorback QB Brittenum then left the game after suffering a shoulder injury and the Hogs fumbled the ball three plays later. LaBruzzo again scored, this time from one yard away, giving the Tigers a 14–7 halftime lead.

Neither team scored in the second half, and Arkansas ended the game on the LSU 24-yard line. Razorback Bobby Crockett set a bowl record with 10 catches for 129 yards.

References

Arkansas
Arkansas Razorbacks football seasons
Southwest Conference football champion seasons
Arkansas Razorbacks football